The men's 200 metre butterfly competition of the swimming events at the 1955 Pan American Games took place on 25 March. It was the first appearance of this event in the Pan American Games.

This race consisted of four lengths of the pool, all lengths being in butterfly stroke.

Results
All times are in minutes and seconds.

Heats

Final 
The final was held on March 25.

References

Swimming at the 1955 Pan American Games